Corazón Salvaje (English Wild Heart) is the 2nd compilation album by Mexican pop singer Mijares. Sometimes it's considered as a normal studio album, but this is a misconception because it has the song "Corazón Salvaje"; that is the only new song and the rest are Mijares' greatest hits.

Track listing
Tracks[]:
 Corazón Salvaje 
 Encadenado	 
 Maria Bonita	 
 No Se Murió el Amor	 
 Para Amarnos Más 
 Uno Entre Mil	 
 No Hace Falta	 
 Ahora Se Me Va 		 
 Ansiedad	 
 Soldado del Amor	 
 Que Puedo Hacer Yo 		 
 Con Tanto Amor 		 
 Piel Canela

Singles
 Corazón Salvaje

Single charts

Album chart
This album reached the 15th position in Billboard Latin Pop Albums.

Manuel Mijares compilation albums
1994 compilation albums